Kauhanen is a Finnish surname. Notable people with the surname include:

 Aarne Kauhanen (1909–1949), Finnish police officer
 Kalle Kauhanen (1900–1969), Finnish bricklayer and politician
 Tuomas Kauhanen (born 1985), Finnish rapper

Finnish-language surnames